Konjsko is a settlement in the Municipality of Vojnik in eastern Slovenia. It lies in the hills west of Vojnik. The area is part of the traditional region of Styria and is now included in the Savinja Statistical Region.

References

External links
Konjsko at Geopedia

Populated places in the Municipality of Vojnik